Radha Govinda Baruah (17 October 1900 – 15 July 1977) was the founder of The Assam Tribune, a group of news papers. Radha Govinda Baruah, an enterprising person in Dibrugarh, first conceived the idea of launching an English daily. With some help from his friends and well wishers, he brought out an English weekly newspaper instead of a daily on 4 August 1939 under the editorship of Lakshminath Phookan, former editorial staff of Hindustan Standard, a leading daily of Anand Bazar Group, Kolkata. He founded the Assam Tribune in 1939. He was a sports enthusiast, who was president of the Assam Cricket Association for over a decade. The iconic Nehru Stadium in Guwahati was built under his leadership in 1962. He is also noted for his contributions to the society and culture of Assam. He is called "the architect of modern Assam" for his being "instrumental in realising the educational needs" of the Assamese people. Radha Govinda Baruah College (or R G Baruah College) in Guwahati is named after him. He is also called the Sinhapurush ("Lion Man") for his immense bravery and enthusiasm.

Honours
In 2000, Baruah was honoured with a postage stamp, part of a series of "Great Leaders : Social and Political" along with Jaglal Choudhary, Vijaya Lakshmi Pandit, and Diwan Bahadur R. Srinivasan.

References

People from Sivasagar district
1977 deaths
1900 births
Mayors of places in Assam
20th-century Indian journalists
Journalists from Assam
Indian company founders
Businesspeople from Assam
Indian sports executives and administrators
Indian cricket administrators
Indian football executives